Great Bend High School Memorial Stadium is a sport stadium in Great Bend, Kansas.  The facility is primarily used by the Great Bend High School football and track & field teams.  The stadium underwent renovation recently. The stadium was also used as a temporary home by nearby Hoisington High School after much of Hoisington suffered severe damage from an F-4 tornado on April 21, 2001.

The Wheat Bowl was played at this location - the only National Association of Intercollegiate Athletics endorsed Pre-Season bowl game.

References

College football venues
Sports venues in Kansas
Buildings and structures in Barton County, Kansas
American football venues in Kansas
High school football venues in the United States